Saperda horni is a species of beetle in the family Cerambycidae. It was described by Joutel in 1902. It is known from Canada and the United States. The species name is often misspelled as hornii.

References

horni
Beetles described in 1902